Alfredo Olvera (born 4 January 1948) is a Mexican wrestler. He competed at the 1972 Summer Olympics and the 1980 Summer Olympics.

References

External links
 

1948 births
Living people
Mexican male sport wrestlers
Olympic wrestlers of Mexico
Wrestlers at the 1972 Summer Olympics
Wrestlers at the 1980 Summer Olympics
Place of birth missing (living people)
Pan American Games medalists in wrestling
Pan American Games silver medalists for Mexico
Pan American Games bronze medalists for Mexico
Wrestlers at the 1975 Pan American Games
Wrestlers at the 1979 Pan American Games
Medalists at the 1975 Pan American Games
Medalists at the 1979 Pan American Games
20th-century Mexican people
21st-century Mexican people